Olle Andersson may refer to:
 Olle Andersson (tennis) (1895–1974), Swedish tennis player
 Olle Andersson (speedway rider) (1932–2017), Swedish speedway rider